The Ministry of the Public Security of Brazil, is the civilian cabinet organization responsible for managing federal police offices and penintentiary departments. It is headed by the Minister of the Public Security.

It is a branch from the Ministry of Justice, then called Ministry of Justice and Public Security. After an increase in violence ratings in Rio de Janeiro and a military intervention evoked by the Brazilian federal government, President Michel Temer signed a Provisional Measure, creating the ministry temporarily. President Temer nominated Raul Jungmann as Extraordinary Minister, moving him from the Ministry of Defence. In January 2019, President Jair Bolsonaro merged the Ministry of Public Security and the Ministry of Justice and appointed former Federal Judge Sergio Moro as the Minister of Justice and Public Security.

References

Public Security
Brazil, Public Security
2018 establishments in Brazil
Public safety ministries